Aranda is a comarca in Aragon, Spain. Its capital is Illueca.

The Aranda and the Isuela River flow through this sparsely populated comarca located in a mountainous area of the Iberian System.

Municipalities
 Aranda de Moncayo
 Brea de Aragón
 Calcena
 Gotor
 Illueca
 Jarque
 Mesones de Isuela
 Oseja
 Pomer
 Purujosa
 Sestrica
 Tierga
 Trasobares

References

External links 

Comarca del Aranda official site

Comarcas of Aragon
Geography of the Province of Zaragoza
Sistema Ibérico